Phineas Clawson (October 27, 1839 – August 10, 1910) was a member of the Wisconsin State Senate.

Biography
Clawson was born on October 27, 1839 in Greene County, Pennsylvania. He moved to Waukesha, Wisconsin in 1851 and to Green County, Wisconsin in 1868. In 1863, he graduated from what is now the University of Wisconsin-Madison.

During the American Civil War, Clawson served as a first lieutenant with the 20th Wisconsin Volunteer Infantry Regiment of the Union Army. He was wounded at the Battle of Prairie Grove. Other conflicts he took part in include the Siege of Vicksburg, during which time he was involved in the Yazoo City Expedition, and the Battle of Spanish Fort.

Clawson died of throat cancer on August 10, 1910 in Monroe, Wisconsin.

Political career
Clawson was a member of the Senate representing the 12th district. Additionally, he was District Attorney of Green County. He was a Republican.

References

External links

People from Greene County, Pennsylvania
Politicians from Waukesha, Wisconsin
People from Green County, Wisconsin
Republican Party Wisconsin state senators
District attorneys in Wisconsin
People of Wisconsin in the American Civil War
Union Army officers
University of Wisconsin–Madison alumni
1839 births
1910 deaths
Burials in Wisconsin
19th-century American politicians
Military personnel from Pennsylvania